Havnar Róðrarfelag is a Faroese rowing club in Tórshavn. Havnar Róðrarfelag was founded on 25 June 1932. The club is the most winning Faroese rowing club since 1973, and has won 61 Faroese championships, Argja Róðrarfelag comes second with 22 championships. The boats participate in the rowing competitions which are held around the islands in June and July, starting with Norðoyastevna in Klaksvík and ending with the final boat race at Ólavsøka in Tórshavn.

Faroese Rowboats for Rowing Competitions 
Havnar Róðrarfelag owns 8 wooden rowing boats, which are of all the sizes, which are used in Faroese rowing competitions; the boats are called 5-mannafar, 6-mannafar (both 5-mannafar and 6-mannafar are manned by 6 rowers and one steerman), 8-mannafar (manned by 8 rowers and one steerman) and 10-mannafar (manned by 10 rowers and one steerman). Havnar Róðrarfelag owns a large boat house, where the boats are stored, when they are not in use. Havnar Róðrarfelag owns these rowboats:
Drekin, 5 mannafar
Sílið, 5 mannafar
Títlingur, 5 mannafar
Gongurólvur, 6 mannafar
Víkingur, 6 mannafar
Ørvur, 8 mannafar
Bláskelin, 10 mannafar
Havnarbáturin, 10 mannafar

Faroese Champions 
Several of the boats of Havnar Róðrarfelag have won the Faroese championship. The champion is determined by seven races; it may take fewer, if the difference between the first two is more than seven points, which cannot be overcome. The winner of each race gets seven points, second place gets six points, etc. The boat which has most points after the final race on Ólavsøka wins the Faroese championship.

The Board of Havnar Róðrarfelag 

The board of Havnar Róðrarfelag is manned by five persons.

 Skarpheðin Njálson, Chairman, elected in 2008
 Róar W. Dalsgaard, Secretary, elected in 2010
 Sigfríður á Plógv Hansen, Vice Chairman, elected in 2010
 Jóan Pauli Lamhauge, Chief financial officer, elected in 2008
 Eirikur á Kletti, Board Member, elected in 2010

Photos

References

External links 
 Drekin.fo, The official website of Havnar Róðrarfelag

Sport in Tórshavn
Sports clubs established in 1932
Rowing clubs in the Faroe Islands